XHGNK-FM (96.7 MHz) is a radio station in Nuevo Laredo, Tamaulipas, Mexico.

History
XEGNK-AM 1370 received its concession on June 26, 1962. It was owned by Guillermo Nuñez Keith.

XEGNK-AM was selected for second-wave AM-FM migration in Nuevo Laredo and signed on XHGNK-FM, the last of five such new FM stations for the city, on June 20, 2019. On July 29, after simulcasting XEGNK-AM with no changes, the new station relaunched as La Lupe 96.7 with the Multimedios Radio format. The IFT approved the transfer of the XHGNK-FM concession from Grupo Radiorama to Multimedios on April 1, 2020. Two months later, on June 20, 2020, the AM was shut down for good.

References

External links

Radio stations in Nuevo Laredo
Multimedios Radio
Regional Mexican radio stations
Radio stations established in 1962
1962 establishments in Mexico